Claude Ménard may refer to:
 Claude Ménard (athlete) (1906–1980), French high jumper
 Claude Ménard (economist) (born 1944), Canadian economist and professor